Randon may refer to:

Arzenc-de-Randon, canton of France, located in the Lozère department, in the Languedoc-Roussillon region
Châteauneuf-de-Randon, commune in the Lozère department in southern France
Rieutort-de-Randon, commune in the Lozère department in southern France

People with the surname
Gabriel Randon, real name of the poet Jehan-Rictus (1867–1933)
Jacques Louis Randon, 1st Comte Randon (1795–1871), French military and political leader
Lucile Randon (1904–2023), French supercentenarian